MV Cape Henry (T-AKR-5067) is a roll-on/roll-off cargo ship.

Construction and career 

The Cape Henry was originally built as a commercial ship in 1979 and sold to the  Ocean Transport and Trading Co. with the name Barber Priam.
It served as a merchant ship until it was purchased by the US Department of Transportation, Maritime Administration, on 30 September 1986. Operated under contract by Marine Transport Lines of Weehawken. 

She was anchored in the Bay of Gibraltar on 18 May 1993. 

It was later transferred to the Maritime Administrations Ready reserve fleet and assigned to San Francisco.

Further reading
(https://web.archive.org/web/20120616101500/http://www.msc.navy.mil/inventory/ships.asp?ship=35) Military Sealift Command Ship Inventory
(http://www.navsource.org/archives/09/54/545067.htm) NavSource Online: Service Ship Photo Archive

References

Ships built by Mitsubishi Heavy Industries
1978 ships
Transports of the United States Navy
Gulf War ships of the United States